Vincent Patrick is the author of the cult crime novels The Pope of Greenwich Village and Family Business.  He adapted both novels for the screen.  The Pope of Greenwich Village, directed by Stuart Rosenberg and starring Eric Roberts, Mickey Rourke and Daryl Hannah, was released in 1984.  Family Business, directed by Sidney Lumet and starring Sean Connery, Dustin Hoffman and Matthew Broderick, was released in 1989.

Patrick also served as a screenwriter on many movies, including Beverly Hills Cop, The Godfather Part III, and The Devil's Own.

Novels
The Pope of Greenwich Village (1979)
Family Business (1985)
Smoke Screen (1999)

Screenwriting credits
Beverly Hills Cop (1984) (uncredited)
The Pope of Greenwich Village (1984)
Family Business (1989)
The Godfather Part III (1990)
At Play in the Fields of the Lord (1991)
Money Train (1995)
The Devil's Own (1997)
To Serve and Protect (1999)

References

External links
 

20th-century American novelists
American crime fiction writers
American male novelists
American male screenwriters
Living people
20th-century American male writers
Year of birth missing (living people)